Rohl or Röhl is a surname, and may refer to:

 Charles Roehl (1857–1927), Washington state pioneer and businessman
 Christoph Röhl (born 1967), British-German filmmaker
 David Rohl (born 1950), British Egyptologist
 Edwin Rohl (1908–1996), American legislator
 Elisabeth Röhl (1888–1930), German politician
 Gisela Röhl, German racing cyclist
 John C. G. Röhl (born 1938), British historian
 Kacey Rohl (born 1991), Canadian actress
 Klaus Rainer Röhl (born 1928), German journalist and author
 Maria Röhl (1801–1875), Swedish portrait artist
 Michael Rohl, Canadian TV director
 Michelle Rohl (born 1965), American race-walker
 William Roehl (1890–1968), Washington state pioneer and businessman

See also
Röhl, Germany